Quercus diversifolia is an uncommon North American species of oak native to Mexico. It has been found in the states of Nuevo León, Durango, México, and Puebla.

The leaves are green on the upper surface, yellow-brown on the underside, with wavy edges.

References

External links
 
 
 photo of herbarium specimen collected in Nuevo León in 1988

diversifolia
Endemic oaks of Mexico
Plants described in 1801
Taxa named by Aimé Bonpland
Flora of the Sierra Madre Occidental